Rimbach may refer to the following places:

in Germany:
Rimbach, Upper Palatinate, in the district of Cham, Bavaria
Rimbach, Lower Bavaria, in the district Rottal-Inn, Bavaria
Rimbach, Hesse, in the district Bergstraße, Hesse
Rimbach (Herrgottsbach), a river of Baden-Württemberg, upper course of the Herrgottsbach
in France:
Rimbach-près-Masevaux, in the department Haut-Rhin
Rimbach-près-Guebwiller, in the department Haut-Rhin